Tamar  Assembly constituency   is an assembly constituency in  the Indian state of Jharkhand.

Members of Assembly 
2005: Ramesh Singh Munda, Janata Dal (United)
2009: Gopal Krishna Patar, Janata Dal (United)
2009 (By Election): Gopal Krishna Patar, Jharkhand Party
2014: Vikash Kumar Munda, All Jharkhand Students Union
2019: Vikash Kumar Munda, Jharkhand Mukti Morcha

Election Results

2019

See also
Vidhan Sabha
List of states of India by type of legislature

References

Assembly constituencies of Jharkhand